Yermolayevo is a rural locality (a selo) and the administrative center of Kuyurgazinsky District in the Republic of Bashkortostan, Russia. Its population was

References

Notes

Sources

Rural localities in Kuyurgazinsky District